Kalah Sara (also Romanized as Kalah Sarā and Kaleh Sarā) is a village in Asalem Rural District, Asalem District, Talesh County, Gilan Province, Iran. At the 2006 census, its population was 1,089, in 253 families.

References 

Populated places in Talesh County